Xaviera Simmons is an American contemporary artist. She works in photography, performance, painting, video, sound art, sculpture, and installation. Between 2019 and 2020, Simmons was a visiting professor and lecturer at Harvard University. Simmons was a Harvard University Solomon Fellow from 2019-2020. Simmons has stated in her lectures and writings that she is a descendant of Black American enslaved persons, European colonizers and Indigenous persons through the institution of chattel slavery on both sides of her family's lineage.

Education
Simmons received her BFA from Bard College in 2004, studying under An-My Lê, Larry Fink, Mitch Epstein, Lucy Sante and Stephen Shore. She completed the Whitney Museum of American Art’s Independent Study Program in Studio Art in 2005, while simultaneously completing a two-year actor-training conservatory with The Maggie Flanigan Studio.

Artwork, exhibitions and critical writing

Simmons has exhibited works nationally and internationally. Her work has been shown at the Museum of Modern Art (New York), MoMA PS1 (Long Island City, New York), Museum of Contemporary Art, Chicago, Studio Museum in Harlem (New York), Contemporary Arts Museum Houston, Walker Art Center (Minneapolis), the Pérez Art Museum Miami, and the Institute of Contemporary Art, Boston. In 2017, Simmons had a solo exhibition of her work at the Radcliffe Institute for Advanced Study at Harvard University.

The 2008 Public Art Fund's program for emerging artists commissioned Simmons to produce a three-week project. The project, Bronx as Studio,  used the streets of the Bronx as a space for sidewalk games, classic photographic portraiture, and performance art. Passersby were encouraged to participate in various activities including hopscotch, soapbox speaking, chess, and Double Dutch. Simmons provided props and background elements, against which all of the publics' spontaneous activities were recorded. Color portraits were sent directly back to participants, as a way of completing the process of active, creative participation.

She participated in the Artists Experiment series at the Museum of Modern Art in 2013. Simmons acted as both artist and archivist, tracing the museum's own history while extracting and reinstating examples of political action through gesture.

Coded was a survey exhibition at The Kitchen in 2016. In relation to it, Simmons also created a performance work using archival materials and resources to explore queer history, homoeroticism, and Jamaican dancehall culture.

In 2018, Simmons made a public art installation on Hunter's Point South Park on the East River in Queens, New York. The installation, Convene, consisted of inverted canoes painted in the colors of the national flags of some immigrant populations in the area.

In 2019, Simmon wrote an opinion piece for The Art Newspaper, with the title "Whiteness must undo itself to make way for the truly radical turn in contemporary culture." She also pulled out as a panelist at IdeasCity Bronx, a New Museum festival, when local Bronx organizers shut it down with their concerns.

In 2021, Simmon's work was featured in Polyphonic: Celebrating PAMM's Fund for African American Art, a group show at Pérez Art Museum Miami highlighting artists in the museum collection acquired through the PAMM Fund for African American Art, an initiative created in 2013. Along with Xaviera Simmons, among the exhibiting artists were Faith Ringgold, Tschabalala Self, Romare Bearden, Juana Valdez, Edward Clark, Kevin Beasley, and others.

Museum acquisitions 

Simmons' work is held in the following collections, among others:
 Pérez Art Museum Miami, Florida
 The Museum of Modern Art, New York

 the de la Cruz Collection, Miami, Florida
 the Institute of Contemporary Art, Boston, Massachusetts
 the Institute of Contemporary Art, Miami, Florida

References

Further reading
 National Museum of Women in the Arts blog : Artist Spotlight : Xaviera Simmons
 MoMA Magazine : A Day with Xaviera Simmons

External links
 MoMA PS1 Studio Visit: Xaviera Simmons
 BOMB Magazine: Xaviera Simmons by Adam Pendleton, 2009
 The Record: Contemporary Art and Vinyl at The Nasher Museum of Art, Duke University
Xaviera Simmons on the African American Visual Artists Database

African-American contemporary artists
American contemporary artists
American women performance artists
American performance artists
1974 births
Living people
21st-century American photographers
Bard College alumni
Photographers from New York City
21st-century American women photographers
21st-century African-American women
21st-century African-American artists
20th-century African-American people
20th-century African-American women